Evan Call (born June 29, 1988) is an American composer and arranger working in Japan. He has composed music for multiple anime series, such as Violet Evergarden and Muv-Luv Alternative. Call is affiliated with the Japanese agency Miracle Bus and was previously a member of the musical group Elements Garden.

Biography
Evan Call was born in California, U.S., on June 29, 1988. As a teenager, Call was diagnosed with occipital neuralgia and had to take a break from going to school. During that time, he learned to play the guitar and took lessons about bluegrass music from a local teacher. Call later made a friend in his hometown who taught him about Japanese anime and video games, which prompted him to start composing orchestral music. He joined the choir club when he entered high school. After graduating, Call enrolled at the Berklee College of Music, where he majored in film scoring.

After graduating from college, he debated if he should pursue a career in film music in Hollywood. In the end, he decided to move to Japan on a tourist visa to work in the anime and game industry. Three months after his arrival, he was introduced to Junpei Fujita, a music creator working at Elements Garden. After an interview with Fujita and a review of his music portfolio, he joined Elements Garden and began composing music in Japan in 2012, where he gained attention for his grand arrangements and impressive symphonic music. After his employment, Call was introduced to Yōta Tsuruoka, a sound director at Kyoto Animation. Alongside Tsuruoka, Call began composing the soundtracks for the anime series Tokyo ESP and Violet Evergarden. Call would continue to compose soundtracks for other anime series and films such as Josee, the Tiger and the Fish.

Call left Elements Garden on June 30, 2016, due to his contract expiring. Since 2017, he has been a member of the Japanese agency .

Works

Anime

Anime films

Video games

Television dramas

Live-action films

Television programs

Other involvements

References

External links
 Official Miracle Bus profile 
 Evan Call at VGMdb
 
 

1988 births
21st-century American composers
21st-century American male musicians
21st-century American musicians
American expatriates in Japan
American film score composers
American male film score composers
American music arrangers
American television composers
Anime composers
Berklee College of Music alumni
Living people
Male television composers
Musicians from California